The National Centre for Cardiovascular Research (Spanish: Centro Nacional de Investigaciones Cardiovasculares or CNIC) is a Spanish research institute. The Centre was founded in 1999 and has purpose-built facilities on the campus of the Carlos III Health Institute in Madrid. The director is Valentín Fuster.

Since 2005 the institute has been supported by the Government and by a group of leading Spanish companies and charitable foundations (the Pro-CNIC Foundation).

Research programmes
In 2010 Felipe Pétriz, Secretary of State for Research, and Emilio Botín, President of the Santander Group, signed an agreement to launch the CNIC-Santander PESA study (Progression of Early Subclinical Atherosclerosis). This prospective study, which in 2019 concluded its first phase, was aimed at advancing knowledge on the progression of cardiovascular disease.

References

Medical research institutes in Spain
Research institutes in the Community of Madrid